The 1927 College Basketball All-Southern Team consisted of basketball players from the South chosen at their respective positions.

All-Southerns

Guards
Walter Forbes, Georgia (AJ-1)
John McCall, Vanderbilt (AJ-1)
Bunn Hackney, North Carolina (AJ-2)
Cecil Jamison, Georgia Tech (AJ-2)

Forwards
George Keen, Georgia (AJ-1)
Paul Dear, VPI (AJ-1)
Heinie Fair, South Carolina (AJ-2)
George Florence, Georgia (AJ-2)

Center
James Stuart, Vanderbilt (AJ-1)
John Purser, North Carolina (AJ-2)

Key
AJ = selected by sportswriters in the Atlanta Journal.

References

All-Southern